Gonak is a village in Meymand District, Firuzabad County, Fars Province, Iran. At the 2011 census, its population was 1021, in 431 families.

References 

Populated places in Firuzabad County